Pioneer is a free and open source space trading and combat simulator video game inspired by the commercial proprietary Frontier: Elite 2. It is available for Linux, and Microsoft Windows.

Setting 
Pioneer is set at the start of the 33rd century. The player may choose from one of three starting locations: Mars, New Hope or a space station around Barnard's Star.

Gameplay 
The game has no set objective, and the player is free to explore the galaxy and accrue money by performing tasks like trading, piracy or combat missions, allowing them to achieve a higher rank, buy better ships and equipment and hire more crew.

It has a realistic flight and orbital model based on Newtonian physics and a rudimentary atmospheric model with drag and heat build-up.

Development 
Development was started in 2008 by Tom Morton, also known for his work on GLFrontier, as a remake and homage to Frontier: Elite 2. The game is written in C++ and uses OpenGL for graphical rendering. It uses Lua for scripting support. The development migrated in 2011 to a SourceForge.net repository, and some years later to GitHub (downloads are still distributed from Sourceforge).

The project had at times up to 50 developers

Reception and impact 
Pioneer was selected in March 2013 as "HotPick" by Linux Format. Pioneer was used in a physical spaceship flight simulator project in 2013. In 2014 Pioneer was described by PCGamer as "incredibly slick" and named among the "Ten top fan remade classics you can play for free right now". In 2015 a Der Standard article noted the enormous work the fans have achieved with Pioneer as Elite remake and continuation.

Pioneer became a quite popular open source freeware title; between 2011 and May 2017, the game was downloaded via SourceForge.net over 260,000 times.

See also

 Vega Strike
 List of open source games
 List of space flight simulation games

References

External links 

 Pioneer Space Sim homepage

2006 video games
Linux games
Windows games
Open-source video games
Space flight simulator games
Space trading and combat simulators
Virtual economies
Creative Commons-licensed video games
Video game clones
Freeware games
Fangames
Lua (programming language)-scripted software